Mieczysław Nowak (22 December 1936 – 17 May 2006) was a Polish featherweight weightlifter. He competed at the 1964, 1968 and 1972 Olympics and finished in third, fifth and seventh place, respectively. He won one gold (1970) and two silver medals (1965 and 1966) at world championships, and his Olympic bronze also counted as the world championships bronze in 1964. At the European championships, he won three gold (1965, 1966 and 1968), one silver (1970) and 1 bronze medals (1972). Nationally he won four titles (1965–1967, 1970) and set thirteen records.

After retiring from competitions Nowak worked as a coach and a sports official.

References

1936 births
2006 deaths
Polish male weightlifters
Olympic weightlifters of Poland
Olympic bronze medalists for Poland
Weightlifters at the 1964 Summer Olympics
Weightlifters at the 1968 Summer Olympics
Weightlifters at the 1972 Summer Olympics
Olympic medalists in weightlifting
People from Poznań County
Sportspeople from Greater Poland Voivodeship
Medalists at the 1964 Summer Olympics
20th-century Polish people
21st-century Polish people